Triomphant was a 74-gun ship of the line of the French Navy (of the Duquesne sub-class). Built in Rochefort in 1804, she was launched in 1809. She was converted to a hulk in 1828.

She served as the canonical 74-gun ship of the line in the Trianon model collection.

Sources and references
 Les bâtiments ayant porté le nom de Triomphant

Ships of the line of the French Navy
Téméraire-class ships of the line
1809 ships